Wong Shek Pier is a public pier on the shore of Long Harbour in the north-east of Hong Kong's New Territories. It is situated in the Wong Shek area of the Sai Kung Peninsula. Administratively it is in Tai Po District. 

The pier serves kai-to ferry routes to remote settlements on the peninsular and its outlying islands, such as Tap Mun, Wan Tsai and Chek Keng, and provides their principal connection to the rest of Hong Kong. It was reconstructed in 2006.

Transportation

Kowloon Motor Bus 
 Route #94 - from Sai Kung Bus Terminus
 Route #96R - from Diamond Hill MTR Station
 Route #289R - from Sha Tin Central (New Town Plaza) Bus Terminus
Note: All routes ending in “R” run only on weekends and public holidays.

Kai-to 
 Ma Liu Shui - Sham Chung - Lai Chi Chong - Tap Mun - Ko Lau Wan - Chek Keng - Wong Shek Pier
 Wong Shek Pier - Chek Keng - Tap Mun
 Wong Shek Pier - Wan Tsai - Chek Keng

References

Piers in Hong Kong
Sai Kung Peninsula